Rubus multifer is a North American species of dewberry in section Procumbentes (formerly called Flagellares) of the genus Rubus, a member of the rose family. It is locally common in the St. Croix River Valley of Minnesota and Wisconsin, becoming less common or perhaps rare east to Maine and south as far as Illinois and Virginia. It is commonly known as Kinnikinnick dewberry or fruitful dewberry.

In Minnesota, Rubus multifer is listed as a State Special Concern species, where it is found in indigenous oak savanna environments.

References

multifer
Plants described in 1943
Flora of the United States